Eddie Su'a (born 13 January 1983) is a Portuguese international former rugby league footballer who played in the 2000s. Su'a played for the Cronulla Sharks in the National Rugby League as a prop. He was a Portuguese international.

References

External links
Cronulla Sharks profile

1983 births
Australian rugby league players
Australian people of Portuguese descent
Australian sportspeople of Tongan descent
Portuguese people of Tongan descent
Portugal national rugby league team players
Cronulla-Sutherland Sharks players
Rugby league props
Living people